The 2015 EAFF Women's East Asian Cup was the fifth edition of the EAFF Women's East Asian Cup, an international women's football tournament organised by the East Asian Football Federation. Nine of ten EAFF member nations entered the tournament. Only Mongolia did not participate.

Rounds

Preliminary round 1
All matches were held in Guam (UTC+10).

Hosts Guam advanced to the next round with two wins.

Awards

Preliminary round 2
All matches were held in Taiwan (UTC+8).

Awards

Goals
6 goals

 Jeon Ga-eul
 Lee Jung-eun

5 goals

 Yeo Min-ji

3 goals

 Ji So-yun

2 goals

 Tan Wen-lin
 Yu Hsiu-chin
 Kay Fung

1 goals

 Lai Li-chin
 Lin Ya-han
 Wong Shuk Fan
 Kim Do-yeon
 Kim Hye-ri
 Kim Hye-yeong
 Kwon Hah-nul
 Park Hee-young
 Yoo Young-a

Final round

Squads

Match officials
Referees

  Casey Reibelt
  Thein Aye
  Pannipar Kamnueng
  Mai Hoàng Trang

Assistant referees

  Renae Coghill
  Widiya Shamsuri
  Rohaidah Mohamed Nasir
  Praphaiphit Tarik
  Liu Hsiu-mei

Matches
The final stage was held in Wuhan, China on 1 to 8 August 2015. 
Venue: China
Date: 1 – 8 August 2015 
All times listed are local (UTC+8).

Awards

Goals

3 goals

 Ra Un-sim

2 goals

 Ami Sugita
 Ri Ye-gyong
 Wi Jong-sim

1 goals

 Li Dongna
 Wang Shanshan
 Emi Nakajima
 Kumi Yokoyama
 Rika Masuya
 Kim Yun-mi
 Yun Song-mi
 Cho So-hyun
 Jeon Ga-eul
 Jung Seol-bin

Final ranking

Per statistical convention in football, matches decided in extra time are counted as wins and losses, while matches decided by penalty shoot-out are counted as draws.

References

External links 
East Asian Football Federation
EAFF Women's East Asian Cup on Women's Soccer United

2015 EAFF Women's East Asian Cup
2015 in Asian football
2015 in Chinese football
2015 in South Korean football
2015 in Taiwanese football
2015 in Guamanian sports
2015 in Japanese women's football
2015 in North Korean football
2014 in Macau football
2014–15 in Hong Kong football
2015
2014–15 in Guamanian football